S.Sivadas better known as Kovan  is a folk singer cultural and arts group Makkal Kalai Ilakkiya Kazhagam (People's Art and Literary Association). He is known for composing songs and music about concerns and issues of marginalized people. His arrest was criticised by human rights groups including Human Rights Watch and Amnesty International.

Arrests over songs 
In the wake of widespread prohibition movement in Tamil Nadu, Kovan wrote, composed and performed songs criticizing government-run alcohol shops and the governments in power. Those songs came to the attention of officials sympathetic to the AIADMK led state government. In late October, Kovan was arrested by TN Cyber Crime Police "under Sections 124-A (Sedition), 153 (Provoking riots), 505 (1) (b and c) (intent to cause fear and alarm to public against state and incitement). His crime – to have written, performed and released on the internet, songs criticising the state government of Tamil Nadu and its Chief Minister J Jayalalithaa on the burning issue of Prohibition". His arrest prompted wide condemnation from human rights organizations, activist groups, political parties and student bodies with notable exceptions of AIADMK and TN Bharatiya Janata Party. The songs went viral through social media and chat apps.

The state government considers these songs derogatory, sedition and it is attempting to remove these songs from YouTube. It is also trying to shut down the vinavu.com website supportive of the artist works. Amnesty International India re iterated its call to repeal the archaic sedition law. It stated that sedition laws is often used to curb the freedom of expression. Sedition law was first created and used by the colonial British government against the Indian independence movement. Kovan was released on bail on 16 November 2015.He was again arrested for a song against the Ram Rath Yatra and Narendra Modi.

References

Tamil folk singers
Internet censorship in India
Censorship in TamilNadu
Living people
Year of birth missing (living people)